Herbert Craik (born 1880) was a Scottish footballer, who played once for Liverpool as a left half. He also played for Scottish clubs Morton and Hearts.

External links
 LFC History profile

Scottish footballers
Liverpool F.C. players
1880 births
Year of death missing
Greenock Morton F.C. players
Heart of Midlothian F.C. players
Footballers from Greenock
Association football wing halves
English Football League players
Scottish Football League players